Tiona is an unincorporated community in Mead Township, Warren County, Pennsylvania, United States. Tiona is about halfway between the larger towns of Clarendon and Sheffield.

Being within Pennsylvania's oil country, Tiona was the 1882 birthplace of Norris Rods, a sucker rod manufacturing company founded by W.C. Norris.

References

Unincorporated communities in Warren County, Pennsylvania
Unincorporated communities in Pennsylvania